The Glūda–Reņģe Railway is a  long,  gauge railway built in the 19th century to connect Jelgava and Mažeikiai.

References 

Railway lines in Latvia
Railway lines opened in 1873
19th-century establishments in Latvia
5 ft gauge railways in Latvia
1873 establishments in the Russian Empire